Khawr Rawrī or Khor Rori is a bar-built estuary (or river mouth lagoon) at the mouth of Wādī Darbāt in the Dhofar Governorate, Oman, near Taqah. It is a major breeding ground for birds, and used to act as an important harbour for frankincense trade when it was an open estuary. Khor Rori has been identified as the location of Moscha Limen (probably meaning "the harbour of young shoots (μόσχος)" and referring to the possible mangrove vegetation in the past) and Abyssapolis (named after the abyss besides the waterfall of Wādī Darbāt) in ancient Greek literature. The area represents a popular tourist spot within Oman and since 2000, is a part of the UNESCO World Heritage Site, the Land of Frankincense.

Khor Rori is best known for the ruins of the ancient fortified port city of Sumhuram on the eastern bank, which was founded in the 3rd century BC as an outpost for the kingdom of Ḥaḍramawt. After the eclipse of Ḥaḍramawt, Sumhuram was under the influence of the Kingdom of Ḥimyar, as indicated by the Himyarite coins excavated from there. It was finally abandoned in the 5th century, most likely due to the formation of the sandbar blocking the estuary.

There are also archaeological ruins on the two promontories at the mouth of Khor Rori. The eastern promontory (Inqitat Mirbat) is better explored than the western promontory (Inqitat Taqah). Inqitat Mirbat, also known as Khatiya or al-Ḥamr al-Sharqiya, had been inhabited by the 4th century BC before the emergence of Sumhuram, and its settlement history might date back to the 8th century BC. It was abandoned in the 1st or 2nd century, and re-occupied in the medieval period.

History
Inscriptions at Khor Rori report that the town of Sumhuram (Hadramautic: s1mhrm), was founded on royal initiative and settled by Hadhrami emigrants. The Dhofar region was the main source of frankincense in the ancient period, and it seems likely that the foundation of the settlement by the Hadhramaut was in part motivated by wish to control the production of this valuable commodity. Most scholars identify Khor Rori with the frankincense exporting port of Moscha Limen mentioned in this region in the first century CE merchants guide, the Periplus of the Erythraean Sea.

The discovery of Khor Rori / Sumhuram is credited to the English explorer James Theodore Bent, with his wife Mabel, who identified the site during their travels in the region in January 1895. The site has been excavated by the American Foundation for the Study of Man (AFSM) in the early 1950s and by the Italian Mission to Oman (IMTO) since 1994. The excavations have uncovered the ground plan of the settlement and has attested maritime contacts with the Ḥaḑramite homeland, India and the Mediterranean. It was inscribed in 2000, along with other sites along the Incense Route in Oman, as part of the World Heritage Site "Land of Frankincense".

In 1908, J.G. Lorimer recorded Khor Rori in his Gazetteer of the Persian Gulf, noting its location as the eastern extremity of Dhofar proper. He wrote:

Other contexts
In tourism literature, Sumhuram is occasionally promoted as the summer palace of the Queen of Sheba, the legendary ruler of the Sabaʾ Kingdom living in the 10th century BC. It contradicts archaeological evidence which shows that Sumhuram was founded in the 3rd century BC by the kingdom of Ḥaḍramawt.

Some members of The Church of Jesus Christ of Latter Day Saints believe that Khor Rori is the "land Bountiful" where Nephi from the Book of Mormon stayed during his travels from Jerusalem (First Nephi, chapter 17).

Gallery

References 

Land of Frankincense
Archaeological sites in Oman
Book of Mormon studies
Estuaries of Asia
Lagoons of Asia
Bodies of water of Oman
Dhofar Governorate